Yanta Pallana (Quechua llamt'a, llant'a, yanta firewood, pallay to collect, -na a suffix, "a place to collect firewood", also spelled Yantapallana) is a mountain in the Cordillera Central in the Andes of Peru which reaches an altitude of approximately . It is located in the Junín Region, Yauli Province, Yauli District. Yanta Pallana lies west of Wamanripa, south of a lake named Pumaqucha.

References

Mountains of Peru
Mountains of Junín Region